is a 1977 Japanese-language action thriller film starring Sonny Chiba as the international assassin Golgo 13. It is the second live-action movie based on the manga series Golgo 13, after the eponymous 1973 JapaneseIranian film starring Ken Takakura.

Plot
Master assassin Duke Togo—codenamed "Golgo 13"—is hired by an American crime syndicate to kill Chou Lei Fang, a powerful member of the syndicate's Hong Kong branch who has been selling their drugs through his own channels. At the same time, he has to keep an eye out on Smith, a hard-boiled Hong Kong detective who is hell-bent on taking down Chou and his drug-manufacturing organization.

One night, an undercover officer named Lin Li follows Chou and infiltrates his drug factory, but she is shot and captured by his henchmen. The next day, Smith locates Chou's factory after a group of children find Lin Li's communicator, but Lin Li is killed during a shootout and the factory is destroyed. By this time, both Chou and Smith have been made aware that Golgo is in Hong Kong. Smith has a personal vendetta on Golgo, who assassinated a foreign diplomat he was assigned to protect a year earlier. Because of this, Smith urges the police chief to issue a warrant to arrest Chou before Golgo gets to him first. The next day, during a ceremony to open a public swimming pool funded by Chou, Golgo prepares to shoot the drug lord from a nearby building, but a female Caucasian assassin named Leika gets to Chou first. While Smith and his men presume it was Golgo that killed Chou, Golgo suspects someone in Hong Kong higher than Chou ordered the hit. The American syndicate offers Golgo an extra US$100,000 to track down the mastermind. Shortly after Chou's funeral, his widow Li Hua and Leika are killed by Golgo while attempting to trap him and put him down.

Golgo travels to Japan to follow Poranian diplomat Polansky, who had strong ties with Chou. There, he discovers that Polansky is seeking U.S. asylum from the FBI in exchange for vital information related to Chou's drug trafficking network. At the same time, Smith follows the trail and manages to arrest Golgo  when the assassin returns to Hong Kong. Smith attempts to interrogate Golgo, but to no avail, as the assassin is released after police discover that it was Leika who assassinated Chou. On his way to the U.S. Embassy, Golgo is ambushed by a hitman named Schilz, but he kills Schilz, despite being shot in the leg. Meanwhile, Smith and his team discover that Polansky has been receiving drug shipments from all over Southeast Asia, but the police cannot touch him due to diplomatic immunity. Golgo recovers from his wound and heads for Sekirei Island, where Polansky is hiding. Despite having no jurisdiction, Smith and his men raid Sekirei Island. Polansky attempts to escape via helicopter, but Golgo - who is hanging by the side of a cliff, guns him down, sending him out of the helicopter and crashing into the ocean. His body and the briefcase containing evidence of his involvement with Chou's assassination are recovered by Smith's team.

The next day, Golgo and Smith meet again at Kai Tak Airport. Smith punches Golgo, vowing to lock him up should he ever return to Hong Kong.

Cast
 Sonny Chiba as Duke Togo/Golgo 13
 Callan Leung as Dirk Chang Smith
 Etsuko Shihomi as Lin Li
 Jerry Ito as Polansky
 Alan Chui  as Poison Spider Black Dragon (cameo)
 Clayton as Rocky Brown
 Yao Lin Chen as Chan
 Emi Shindo as Yip Lin
 Elaine Sung as Kong Laan
 Dana as Leika
 Kōji Tsuruta as Senzō Shigemune

Home media
Golgo 13: Assignment Kowloon was bundled with The Bullet Train and Executioner in the Kill Chiba Collection Region 1 DVD set by Crash Cinema on May 18, 2004. On November 20, 2007, BCI Eclipse released the film in their Sonny Chiba Collection DVD set, which also includes The Bullet Train, Dragon Princess, The Bodyguard, Karate Warriors, and Sister Street Fighter.

In the UK, the film was bundled with The Bullet Train and G.I. Samurai in The Sonny Chiba Collection Vol. 2 Region 2 DVD set by Optimum Home Releasing.

References

External links
 

1977 films
1977 action films
Live-action films based on manga
Films set in Hong Kong
Films set in Kyoto
Films set in Macau
Films set in Miami
Films set in Tokyo
Films set on islands
Films shot in Hong Kong
Films shot in Japan
Films shot in Macau
Golgo 13
Japanese action films
1970s Japanese-language films
Toei Company films
1970s Japanese films